Anekes is a genus of sea snails, marine gastropod mollusks, unassigned in the superfamily Seguenzioidea.

Species
Species within the genus Anekes include:
 Anekes affinis (Jeffreys, 1883)
 Anekes anderswareni Hoffman, Gofas & Freiwald, 2020
 Anekes mikrosculpta Hoffman, Gofas & Freiwald, 2020
 Anekes paucistriata Warén, 1992
 Anekes sculpturata Warén, 1992
 Anekes spiralis Serge GOFAS, Ángel A. LUQUE, Joan Daniel OLIVER, José TEMPLADO & Alberto SERRA, 2021  
 Anekes umbilisculpta Hoffman, Gofas & Freiwald, 2020
 Anekes undulisculpta Bouchet & Warén, 1979
 Anekes varisculpta Hoffman, Gofas & Freiwald, 2020
Species brought into synonymy
 Anekes gittenbergeri van Aartsen & Bogi, 1988: synonym of Lissotesta gittenbergeri (van Aartsen & Bogi, 1988)
 Anekes giustii Bogi & Nofroni, 1989: synonym of Mikro giustii (Bogi & Nofroni, 1989)
 Anekes inflata Warén, 1992: synonym of Granigyra inflata (Warén, 1992)
 Anekes nofronii van Aartsen & Bogi, 1988: synonym of Lissotesta turrita (Gaglini, 1987) 
 Anekes sabellii Bogi & Nofroni 1989: synonym of Lissomphalia bithynoides (Monterosato, 1880)
 Anekes undulispira [sic] : synonym of Anekes undulisculpta Bouchet & Warén, 1979 (misspelling)

References

 Bouchet, P. & Warén, A. (1979). The abyssal molluscan fauna of the Norwegian Sea and its relation to other faunas. Sarsia. 64: 211-243.
 Spencer, H.G., Marshall, B.A. & Willan, R.C. 2009 Recent Mollusca. pp 196–219 in: Gordon, D.P. (Ed.), The New Zealand inventory of biodiversity. 1. Kingdom Animalia: Radiata, Lophotrochozoa, Deuterostomia. Canterbury University Press, Christchurch

External links
 Warén A. (1992). New and little known "Skeneimorph" gastropods from the Mediterranean Sea and the adjacent Atlantic Ocean. Bollettino Malacologico 27(10-12): 149-248
  Gofas, S.; Le Renard, J.; Bouchet, P. (2001). Mollusca, in: Costello, M.J. et al. (Ed.) (2001). European register of marine species: a check-list of the marine species in Europe and a bibliography of guides to their identification. Collection Patrimoines Naturels, 50: pp. 180–213
 Kano Y., Chikyu, E. & Warén, A. (2009) Morphological, ecological and molecular characterization of the enigmatic planispiral snail genus Adeuomphalus (Vetigastropoda: Seguenzioidea). Journal of Molluscan Studies, 75:397-418

 
Gastropod genera